Raymond Burki (2 September 1949 – 29 December 2016) was a Swiss cartoonist. He did over 8,000 drawings over the course of his career, and spent four decades as a cartoonist for 24 heures.

Early life
Raymond Burki was born on 2 September 1949 in Épalinges, Vaud, Switzerland. His father was a cook.

Burki was trained in photo manipulation in a rotogravure firm in Lausanne. He was an avid reader of Charlie Hebdo in his youth.

Career
Burki started his career in Paris for a year, until he returned to Switzerland to work in rotogravure from 1971 to 1979.

Burki published his first cartoon in La Tribune de Lausanne in 1976. He subsequently worked as a cartoonist for 24 heures over four decades. He also published cartoons in Bilan and Die Sonntagszeitung. He was best known for his ironic cartoons of politicians, most of which contained no words, only drawings. He did over 8,000 drawings over the course of his career, and he retired in 2014. Many of his cartoons were published as books.

Burki won the Prix du meilleur dessin étranger in Epinal in 1988, the Prix du public in Morges 1989, the Prix Jean Dumur in 1990, the Prix du meilleur livre d'humour Juvignac in 1998, and the Prix de la Fondation vaudoise pour la promotion et la création artistiques in 2003.

Personal life, death and legacy
Burki resided in his hometown of Épalinges. He enjoyed angling for mussels. He was left-wing.

Burki died of cancer on 29 December 2016. His funeral will be held at the Abbey of Montheron in Montheron near Lausanne.

Upon his death, Jacqueline de Quattro, a member of the Council of State of Vaud, "He was a very touching person, and I admired his free spirit. Even though his drawings could be vitriolic, they were also respectful and tender towards people. I was honored to be cartooned by him."

Selected works

Further reading

References

1949 births
2016 deaths
People from the canton of Vaud
Swiss cartoonists
Deaths from cancer in Switzerland